Cuento is a Spanish word meaning literally "story" or "tale". Cuento may specifically refer to folk tales, a category of folklore that includes stories passed down through oral tradition.  The word cuento may also be used as a verb to say "tell", as if you are "telling" a story ("Cuento").

Cuentos is more common to read to children at bedtime or just to entertain them. Many times cuentos are a good way to teach children to read at an early age and opens their mind to imagination.

Varieties 
Idioms using this word, translated into English, include:
 contar un cuento – to tell a story
 cuento de hadas – fairy tale
 cuento de fantasmas – ghost story
 cuento de viejas – old wives' tale
 va de cuento – the story goes, or it is said
 cuento folklórico – folk tale

In Spain 
Ralph S. Boggs, a folklorist who studied Spanish and other European folktales, also compiled an index of tales across ten nations, one of these nations Spain. Hansen notes that in Boggs' A Comparative Survey of the Folktales of Ten Peoples, Spain also had a large number of animal tales, pointing out the "marked interest in such tales in Spain and in Spanish America"; however, he indicates that Boggs' study showed Spain with a much lower percent of magic tales. After several such comparisons showing very close similarities as well as almost-opposite differences, he concluded that the index-analysis should be conducted for the other Spanish-speaking parts of the Americas before any explicit conclusions can be made about folktales in Latin America. Whether or not Latin American folktales should be compared to Spanish folktales as if they were a subcategory was not mentioned in the article; however, with differences in religion, tradition, history and other such elements that can turn a story into an entirely new direction, it is possible that folklorists will regard Latin American tales unique to Spanish tales in the future.

According to Spanish folklorist , among the Magic Tales of the Aarne-Thompson-Uther Index, the following types are some of the most popular found in Spain, in the following order:

 AaTh 313, La Muchacha como ayudante del héroe (Blancaflor);
 AaTh 408, Las Tres Naranjas (La negra y la paloma);
 AaTh 480, Las muchachas amable y antipática;
 AaTh 707, Los tres hijos de oro (El pájaro que habla, el árbol que canta y el agua amarilla);
 AaTh 300, El matador del dragón (El dragón de siete cabezas);
 AaTh 510B, Los vestidos de oro, de plata y de estrellas (Piel de Asno);
 AaTh 301B, El fortachón y sus compañeros (Juanillo el Oso o Juanillo la Burra);
 AaTh 302, El corazón del ogro en un huevo;
 AaTh 425A and variants, El Animal como esposo (Cupido y Psique);
 AaTh 700, Ganbarcito;
 AaTh 706, La muchacha sin manos;
 AaTh 510A, Cenicienta.

Scholar James M. Taggart stated that tale type 425, "Search for the Lost Husband", was more popular in Spanish tradition than type 400, "Quest for the Lost Wife", which he noted to be more rarely collected. Hispanist  also remarked on the popularity of types 313 ("The Magic Flight"), 408 ("The Three Oranges"), 425 ("The Search for the Lost Husband"), 706 ("The Maiden Without Hands") and 707 ("The Three Golden Sons").

In Latin America 
Latin American tales are unique in that they may represent a time before European invasion, and they may combine those traditions with the history and culture that arrived post-conquest. When the Spaniards came to Latin America in the 16th century, the indigenous people were forced to assimilate their culture with the Europeans'.  Likewise, the content of the stories differed between the ages. However, there are few resources on cuentos for pre-conquest indigenous peoples in South America. A folklorist specializing in Spain and Spanish-originated folklore, Aurelio M. Espinosa discovered that "most of the Spanish folklore which is found today in the Spanish-speaking countries of America is of traditional Spanish origin".  Pre-conquest information can only be found in what is left; this includes archaeological artifacts, sculpture and pottery, stories engraved in bone, shell, and stones, and codices.  Only seventeen codices are intact, "fifteen of which are known to predate the Colonial era, and two of which originated either before the Conquest or very soon after".

With the knowledge that the natives in Latin America were made to blend culturally with the Spaniards when they arrived, the similarity of Latin American stories to Spanish stories must be considered. Terrence L. Hansen, a Latin American folklorist, attempted to index 1,747 folktales into 659 indexes such as "animal tales", "magic tales", "religious tales", and "jokes and anecdotes".  The purpose of the study was to make "accessible to folklorists both the individual types and the broad picture of the folktale in a large part of Spanish America".

In Chile
Folklorist  compiled two volumes of Chilean folktales. According to his observations, the trickster figure Pedro Urdemales is very popular, and, among the tales of magic, the most common tale types in his country, in descending order, were:

 Type 425, La búsqueda del esposo perdido ("The Search for the Lost Husband"); 
 Type 402, La mona como esposa ("The Monkey as Wife");
 Type 301, Las tres princesas robadas ("The Three Stolen Princesses");
 Type 303, Los dos hermanos ("The Two Brothers"); 
 Type 313, La fuga mágica ("The Magic Flight");
 Type 328, El niño roba los tesoros del gigante ("The Boy Steals the Giant's Treasures"); 
 Type 471, El puente que conduce al otro mundo ("The Bridge that Leads to Other World"); 
 Type 706, La niña sin manos ("The Girl Without Hands").

Saavedra also located other tale types that "sporadically" appear in Chilean collections:

 Type 304, El cazador diestro ("The Skilled Hunter");
 Type 306, Los zapatos gastados en la danza ("The Danced-out Shoes"); 
 Type 410, La bella durmiente ("The Sleeping Beauty");
 Type 432, El principe encantado en forma de pájaro ("The Prince as a Bird");
 Type 433B, El principe encantado en forma de serpiente ("The Prince as Serpent");
 Type 514, El cambio de sexo ("The Shift of Sex");
 Type 565, El molino mágico ("The Magic Windmill");
 Type 592, El violin mágico ("The Magic Violin").

 References 

 Further reading 

Studies
 Espinosa, Aurelio M. "Los cuentos populares españoles". In: Boletín de la Biblioteca de Menéndez Pelayo (1923), pp. 39-61. Alicante: Biblioteca Virtual Miguel de Cervantes, 2019.
 Espinosa, Aurelio M. "More Spanish Folk-Tales". In: Hispania 22, no. 1 (1939): 103–114. doi:10.2307/332177.
 Espinosa, Aurelio M. "Spanish and Spanish-American Folk Tales". In: The Journal of American Folklore 64, no. 252 (1951): 151–162. doi:10.2307/536633.
 Ibáñez, Emilia Cortés. "Eros y Psique en la tradición oral de España e Hispanoamérica". In: Actas del XIV Congreso de la Asociación Internacional de Hispanistas: New York, 16-21 de Julio de 2001. Coord. por Isaías Lerner, Roberto Nival, Alejandro Alonso, Vol. 1, 2004 (Literatura medieval, lingüística, historia, teoría literaria, estudios culturales). pp. 347–356. .
 三原, 幸久 [Mihara, Yukihisa]. ハンゼンおよびローブ以後のイスパノアメリカ昔話の試験的な話型索引 [Una lista tentativa suplementaria a los índices de los cuentos populares hispanoamericanos por Terrence Leslie Hansen y Stanley L. Robe]. In: "大阪外国語大学学報" 53 (1981). pp. 67-108. . 
 Ríos, Jorge Martínez. “Materiales Para El Estudio Del Folklore Del Estado de Oaxaca, México (Bibliografía Anexa)”. In: Revista Mexicana de Sociología 23, no. 2 (1961): 585–619. https://doi.org/10.2307/3538282.

Folktale catalogues (general)
 Amores, Monstserrat. Catalogo de cuentos folcloricos reelaborados por escritores del siglo XIX. Madrid: Consejo Superior de Investigaciones Científicas, Departamento de Antropología de España y América. 1997. .
 Boggs, Ralph Steele. Index of Spanish folktales, classified according to Antti Aarne's "Types of the folktale". Chicago: University of Chicago. 1930.
 CAMARENA, JULIO & Maxime CHEVALIER (1995). Catálogo tipográfico del cuento folklórico español. Vol. I: Cuentos maravillosos. Madrid, Castalia. 
 Camarena, Julio e Chevalier, Maxime. Catálogo tipológico del cuento folklórico español: cuentos religiosos e cuentos novela. Madrid, Centro de Estudios Cervantinos, 2003. 2 vols.

Folktale catalogues of Spain
 Asiáin, Alfredo (2006). "Narraciones folklóricas navarras. Recopilación, clasificación y análisis". In: Cuadernos de Etnología y Etnografía de Navarra. 81 (enero/diciembre 2006): 1-289.
 Atiénzar García, Mª del Carmen. Cuentos populares de Chinchilla. España, Albacete: Instituto de Estudios Albacetenses "Don Juan Manuel". 2017. .
 Beltrán, Rafael (2007). Rondalles populars valencianes: Antologia, catàleg i estudi dins la tradició del folklore universal. Valencia: Universitat de València. .
 Camarena Laucirica, Julio. "Los cuentos tradicionales en Ciudad Real". In: Narria: Estudios de artes y costumbres populares 22 (1981): 36-40. .
 Camarena, Julio. Cuentos tradicionales de León. 	Tradiciones orales leonesas, 3-4. Madrid : Seminario Menéndez Pidal, Universidad Complutense de Madrid; [León]: Diputación Provincial de León, 1991. 2 volumes.
 Campos, Camiño Noia. Catalogue of Galician Folktales. Folklore Fellows’ Communications nr. 322. Helsinki: The Kalevala Society, 2021. .
 Espinosa, Aurelio M., hijo. Cuentos populares de Castilla y León. Madrid: Consejo Superior de Investigaciones Científicas, 1987.
 García, Ana Manuela Martínez. Cuentos de transmisión oral del Levante Almeriense. Editorial Universidad de Almería, 2012. .
 González Sanz, Carlos (1996a). Catálogo tipológico de cuentos folklóricos aragoneses. Zaragoza: Instituto Aragonés de Antropología.
 Hernández Fernández, Ángel. Catálogo tipológico del cuento folclórico en Murcia. Colección El Jardín de la Voz: Biblioteca de Literatura Oral y Cultura Popular, Vol. 13. Alcalá de Henares: Área de Teoría de la Literatura y Literatura Comparada de la Universidad de Alcalá: Centro de Estudios Cervantinos; Ciudad de México: Instituto de Investigaciones Filológicas de la UNAM, 2013. .
 Marcos, Elías Rubio; Pedrosa, José Manuel; Palacios, César-Javier. Cuentos burgaleses de tradición oral. Teoría, etnotextos y comparatismo. Burgos: Colección Tentenublo, 2002.
 Noia Campos, Camiño (2010). Catálogo tipolóxico do conto galego de tradición oral. Clasificación, antoloxía e bibliografía. Vigo: Servizo de Publicacións da Universidade de Vigo.
 Oriol, Carme; Josep M. Pujol (2003). Índex tipològic de la rondalla catalana. Barcelona: Departament de Cultura de la Generalitat de Catalunya. Centre de Promoció de la Cultura Popular i Tradicional Catalana.
 Oriol, Carme; Josep M. Pujol (2008). Index of Catalan Folktales. Folklore Fellows’ Communications 294. Helsinki: Suomalainen Tiedeakatemia.
 Sánchez Ferra, A. J. (1998). "CAMÁNDULA: EL CUENTO POPULAR EN TORRE PACHECO". In: Revista Murciana de Antropología, (5), 23–314. Recuperado a partir de https://revistas.um.es/rmu/article/view/73221
 Sánchez Ferra, Anselmo J. (2010). "El cuento folclórico en Cartagena". In: Revista Murciana de Antropología, (17): 1–815. DOI: https://doi.org/10.6018/rmu
 Sánchez Ferra, A. J. (2013). "El cuento folclórico en Lorca 1". In: Revista Murciana de Antropología, (20): 1–431. Recuperado a partir de https://revistas.um.es/rmu/article/view/247361
 Sánchez Ferra, Anselmo J. (2014). "El cuento folclórico en Lorca 2". In: Revista Murciana de Antropología, (21): 1–430. DOI: https://doi.org/10.6018/rmu

Folktale catalogues of Latin America
 Andrade, Manuel José. Folk-lore from the Dominican Republic. New York: The American Folklore Society, G.E. Stechert and Co. Agents, 1930.
 Hansen, Terrence Leslie. The Types of the Folktale In Cuba, Puerto Rico: the Dominican Republic, And Spanish South America. Berkeley: University of California Press, 1957.
 Robe, Stanley (1972). Index of Mexican Folktales. Including Narrative Texts from Mexico, Central America, and the Hispanic United States. Berkeley-Los AngelesLondon: University of California Press.
 Vidal de Battini, Berta Elena. Cuentos y leyendas populares de la Argentina''. Buenos Aires: Ediciones Culturales Argentinas, 1980. 10 volumes.

External links 
 Spanish folk tales
 Cuentos Infantiles - Latin America Children Stories
 Corpus de Literatura Oral, a Spanish-language online archive of tales by the Universidad de Jaén
 Arxiu de Rondalles Catalanas (Online Archive of Catalan Folktales) (in Catalan)

Folklore
Spanish language